Clarksville High School is a rural public high school  in Clarksville, Iowa, and is part of the Clarksville Community School District.

Athletics
The athletic extracurricular activities at Clarksville High School are cross country, football, volleyball, basketball, wrestling, golf, track and field, softball, baseball, and cheerleading. The Indians are classified as a 1A school,  and compete in the Iowa Star Conference.

State Championships
1991 Class 1A Wrestling State Champions
2020 Class 1A Softball State Champions

Mission Statement
It is the mission of the Clarksville Community School to provide the finest 
educational opportunities so that all might achieve their fullest potential.

See also
List of high schools in Iowa

References

External links
 

Public high schools in Iowa
Schools in Butler County, Iowa